The Bronx Bunny Show is an Irish ten-part series originally broadcast in 2003 on E4 in the United Kingdom and later in Ireland. It was an adult puppet interview show which followed the premise of a semi-educational show for the good people of the Bronx, Brooklyn and Manhattan. The show was produced from a run-down tenement building in the Bronx where Bronx Bunny and his sidekick, a cigarette-smoking panda named Teddy T, would interview celebrities who "done good". The Bronx Bunny Show won "Best Entertainment Show" IFTA Award in 2003.

Also featured on the show were pseudo-educational items, such as 'The Internal Gerbil' who sang songs about internal organs from inside a gay man, numbers illustrated by pole dancing women who contorted into the shape of that week's number, and Spanish phrases such as "Your Mother bangs like a screen door in a tornado".

The show was broadcast sporadically on E4 and eventually on Channel 4. The series gained a cult following as it featured interviews with guests such as Hugh Hefner, Jessica Alba, William Shatner, and Larry Flynt. The show was created by Double Z Enterprises, an Irish production company behind such characters as Zig and Zag and Podge and Rodge.

In 2010, the entire Channel 4 season was made available to view on the 4OD site.

Season one U.K. (2003)

Season one U.S. (2007)
A ten-part series was commissioned by Starz Entertainment and broadcast from 18 April 2007. Guests included Mark Hamill, George Takei, Kelly Carlson, Howie Mandel, Cheech Marin, Beverly D'Angelo, Joely Fisher, Ron Jeremy, Michael Rapaport, Tina Majorino, Wee Man, Method Man, and Eric Roberts. Saved by the Bell star Dustin Diamond played a recurring role as Bronx Bunny's neighbor, who dropped by unannounced and stole items from the apartment.

Other features included:
Teddy T's "Bear Butts" porno series, which featured a number of genuine adult stars such as Asian porn star Mika Tan.
Musical numbers performed by Bronx Bunny on piano and Teddy T on vocals under the name "The Teddy Trio".

Further TV appearances
Bronx Bunny and Teddy T went on to host two specials, The Top 20 Most Controversial TV Moments and Sex Stars They Tried to Ban, for Channel 4. They also appeared as guests on the NBC show Last Comic Standing on 19 September 2007.

Awards
Irish Film and Television Academy Awards:
 Best Entertainment Show - 2003

External links
 Entire Channel 4 Series on demand from 4OD
 Official 'The Bronx Bunny Show' site on MySpace
  'The Bronx Bunny Show' schedule on Starz
 Some behind the scenes photos and video clips of the Bronx Bunny Show

References

Irish television shows
Starz original programming
English-language television shows
Irish television shows featuring puppetry
Television series about pandas
Television series about rabbits and hares